Gündoğdu, Manavgat is a village in the District of Manavgat, Antalya Province, Turkey. With many hotel's and a long beach which end up at the harbor of Side.

References

Villages in Manavgat District